Parker Millsap is an American singer-songwriter and multi-instrumentalist from Purcell, Oklahoma, playing a blend of blues, country, rock, Americana, and folk music. Named one of Americana Music Association's 2014 Emerging Artists of the Year after the release of his eponymous album, Millsap garnered attention with his song "Truck Stop Gospel", which has been featured on NPR's music program The Record. Playing with childhood friend Michael Rose on bass and Daniel Foulks on the fiddle, Millsap's musical style has drawn comparisons to early Elvis Presley. In addition to singing, he plays guitar, harmonica and piano.

He attributes his musical influence to growing up in a Pentecostal Church and listening to blues with his parents.

He has opened for Patty Griffin, Old Crow Medicine Show, Shovels & Rope, Lake Street Dive, John Fullbright, Jason Isbell, and Sarah Jarosz, as well as headlining tours of his own, and counts Elton John as a fan. Millsap's television appearances include Conan and Austin City Limits.

Millsap has released five studio albums.  His 2016 release, The Very Last Day, was declared the 11th best roots album of the year by No Depression. His fourth album, Other Arrangements, was  released on May 4, 2018. Other Arrangements features a more blues, rock, and pop-focused sound than his previous work and is his first release to feature electric instruments. Millsap's fifth album, Be Here Instead was released on April 9, 2021.

Discography

Studio albums

Other appearances

Music videos

Awards and nominations

References

External links

Date of birth missing (living people)
Living people
American country singer-songwriters
Country musicians from Oklahoma
Year of birth missing (living people)
American male singer-songwriters
Singer-songwriters from Oklahoma